Wolpe is a locational surname of German origin, named after the medieval County of Wölpe. It may refer to:
AnnMarie Wolpe (1930-2018), South African sociologist, wife of Harold
Berthold Wolpe (1905–1989), German visual designer
David Wolpe   (born 1958), American rabbi
Harold Wolpe (1926–1996), South African economist, husband of AnnMarie
Howard Wolpe (1939–2011), American politician
Irma Wolpe (1902–1984), Romanian-born composer
Joseph Wolpe (1915–1997), South African psychiatrist
Lenny Wolpe (born 1951), American actor 
Paul Root Wolpe (born 1957), American sociologist
Sholeh Wolpé, Iranian-born American poet, literary translator and playwright
Shalom Dov Wolpo, also Sholom Ber Wolpe (born 1948), Israeli rabbi
Stefan Wolpe (1902–1972), American composer

See also
Volpe
Wölpe, a river in Germany
County of Wölpe, a territorial lordship in the Middle Ages

German-language surnames
Jewish surnames